The Men's 50 km Race Walk event at the 1988 Summer Olympics in Seoul, South Korea had an entry list of 42 competitors. Three athletes were disqualified, while four walkers did not finish the race, held on Friday September 30, 1988.

Medalists

Abbreviations
All times shown are in hours:minutes:seconds

Records

Final ranking

See also
 1987 Men's World Championships 50km Walk (Rome)
 1988 Race Walking Year Ranking
 1990 Men's European Championships 50km Walk (Split)
 1991 Men's World Championships 50km Walk (Tokyo)

References

External links
  Official Report

1
Racewalking at the Olympics
Men's events at the 1988 Summer Olympics